Edward Flynn may refer to:
Edward Flynn (boxer) (1909–1976), American Olympic boxer
Ed Flynn (politician), American politician
Edward J. Flynn (1891–1953), American politician, Democratic boss of the Bronx
Edward A. Flynn (born c. 1948), chief of the Milwaukee Police Department
Eddie Flynn (1919–2002), Irish soccer player
Ed Flynn (baseball) (1864–1929), baseball player
Ted Flynn (1880–1965), Australian rules footballer

See also
Edmund W. Flynn (1890–1957), Chief Justice of the Rhode Island Supreme Court